Sunderland is a hamlet and former civil parish, within the Lake District National Park, now in the parish of Blindcrake in the Allerdale district of the county of Cumbria, England, historically part of Cumberland. In 1931 the parish had a population of 60.

Nearby settlements 
Nearby settlements include the towns of Cockermouth, Keswick, Bothel and Aspatria. The nearest railway station is Aspatria railway station.

Governance
Sunderland is within the Copeland UK Parliamentary constituency,  Trudy Harrison is the Member of parliament.

Before Brexit, its residents were covered by the North West England European Parliamentary Constituency.

For Local Government purposes it is in the All Saints Ward of Allerdale Borough Council and the Bothel + Wharrels Division of Cumbria County Council.

Regarding its Parish Council, on 1 April 1934 the civil parish was abolished and it merged with Blindcrake, Isel and Redmaine, and Isel Old Park to form Blindcrake.

See also

Listed buildings in Blindcrake

References 

 Philip's Street Atlas Cumbria (page 50)

External links
 Cumbria County History Trust: Sunderland (nb: provisional research only – see Talk page)

Hamlets in Cumbria
Former civil parishes in Cumbria
Allerdale